Semioptila vinculum is a moth in the Himantopteridae family. Semioptila vinculum was described by Erich Martin Hering in 1937. It is found West Kasai in the Democratic Republic of the Congo.

References

Moths described in 1937
Himantopteridae